15 Aquarii, abbreviated 15 Aqr, is a single, blue-white star in the zodiac constellation of Aquarius. 15 Aquarii is the Flamsteed designation. It is a dim star that is just visible to the naked eye under good viewing conditions, having an apparent visual magnitude of 5.83. At that distance, the visual magnitude is diminished by an extinction of 0.18 due to interstellar dust. It is moving closer to the Earth with a heliocentric radial velocity of −9 km/s.

Hube (1970) found a stellar classification of B7 III for this star, which would suggest it is a B-type giant star. However, the Bright Star Catalogue (1964) listed it as a B-type main-sequence star with a class of B5 V, and multiple sources use this instead. The star is roughly 65 million years old with a projected rotational velocity of 20 km/s. It has an estimated 5.7 times the mass of the Sun and about 3.4 times the Sun's radius. 15 Aquarii is radiating 822 times the Sun's luminosity from its photosphere at an effective temperature of 14,318 K.

References

B-type giants
Aquarius (constellation)
Durchmusterung objects
Aquarii, 015
202753
105164
8141